Exocarpos humifusus, also known as mountain native-cherry, is a small shrub member of the family Santalaceae, all of which are hemiparasites. Exocarpos humifusus is a dwarfish and sprawling shrub with woody stems, and small dry fruits that grow atop a fleshy red stalk, hence the common name of native-cherry.

Description
Exocarpos humifusus is a rigid, woody dwarf shrub with branches prostrate and spreading over the ground and rocks. The stems are dark yellow-green tinged with red, and are ribbed with rounded edges. The fruit is a small greenish-black drupe or nut  in length, that grows atop a fleshy receptacle. When mature the receptacle of the fruit is dark red fleshy, juicy and edible, attracting animals as distributors.

Habitat and distribution
Exocarpos humifusus is endemic to Tasmania. It grows abundantly above  and on lower elevation mountains in the south-west, in sub-alpine and alpine areas. It is found growing over the surfaces of rocks on mountain plateaus and summits throughout Tasmania. It is widespread among the plant communities of alpine heath and fjaeldmark.

Gallery

References

humifusus
Endemic flora of Tasmania